The Movement for the Comoros (MPC) was a political party in the Comoros.

History
The party was established in 1997 by Saïd Hilali. It nominated its secretary-general Ibrahim Halidi as its candidate for the 2006 presidential elections. In the nationwide second round of voting, Halidi came second with 28% of the vote.

References

Defunct political parties in the Comoros
Political parties established in 1997
1997 establishments in the Comoros